Jack Charles Jeffery (born 13 August 1989) is an English footballer who plays as a striker for Chatham Town.

Career
Jeffery joined West Ham United in 2004, where he was known as "JJ" by his teammates. During the 2007–08 season at West Ham, Jeffery featured regularly at under-18 level and also in the reserves, as well as loan spells at non-league clubs Hampton & Richmond Borough and Cambridge United. He joined League One club Leyton Orient on loan on 12 September 2008, and made his league debut the next day, coming on as a substitute during the first half in the home game against Stockport County. Jeffery's loan with Leyton Orient lasted only one game before he was injured and returned to West Ham. On 2 March 2009, Jeffery signed on loan for Eastbourne Borough until the end of the 2008–09 season. His first goals for Eastbourne came in a 3–0 win against Weymouth on 4 April.

At the end of the 2008–09 season, Jeffery was not offered a professional contract by West Ham and was released. Jeffery subsequently signed for Conference National club Grays Athletic. He was released from Grays in November, and went on to sign for Maldon Town. In early 2011, Jeffrey signed for Sevenoaks Town in the Kent League. In August, it was announced that he had signed for Isthmian League Division One North side Chatham Town.

References

External links

1989 births
Living people
Sportspeople from Gravesend, Kent
Footballers from Kent
English footballers
Association football forwards
West Ham United F.C. players
Hampton & Richmond Borough F.C. players
Cambridge United F.C. players
Leyton Orient F.C. players
Eastbourne Borough F.C. players
Grays Athletic F.C. players
Maldon & Tiptree F.C. players
Sevenoaks Town F.C. players
Chatham Town F.C. players
Corinthian F.C. (Kent) players
English Football League players
National League (English football) players
Isthmian League players